Zaliznychne is an urban-type settlement in Khmilnyk Raion of Vinnytsia Oblast in Ukraine. Zaliznychne belongs to Koziatyn urban hromada, one of the hromadas of Ukraine. Population: 

Until 18 July 2020, Zaliznychne belonged to Koziatyn Municipality. The municipality as an administrative unit was abolished in July 2020 as part of the administrative reform of Ukraine, which reduced the number of raions of Vinnytsia Oblast to six. The area of Koziatyn Municipality was merged into Khmilnyk Raion.

Economy

Transportation
Zaliznychne railway station is located in the settlement, on the railway connecting Berdychiv and Koziatyn. There is infrequent passenger traffic.

The settlement has access to Highway M21 which connects Vinnytsia and Zhytomyr, as well as to Highway H02 connecting  Kremenets and Bila Tserkva.

References

Urban-type settlements in Khmilnyk Raion